The  Grand Isle Senate District is one of 16 districts of the Vermont Senate. The current district plan is included in the redistricting and reapportionment plan developed by the Vermont General Assembly following the 2020 U.S. Census, which applies to legislatures elected in 2022, 2024, 2026, 2028, and 2030. 

The Grand Isle district includes all of Grand Isle County, along with some parts of others.

As of the 2010 census, the state as a whole had a population of 625,741. As there are a total of 30 senators, there were 20,858 residents per senator. 

As of the 2000 census, the state as a whole had a population of 608,827. As there are a total of 30 Senators, there were 20,294 residents per senator.  The Grand Isle District had a population of 21,935 in that same census.  The district is apportioned one senator. The district's 21,935 residents per senator is 8.09% above the state average.

District Senators 
As of 1984:
Richard Mazza, Democrat

Towns and cities in the Grand Isle District, 2002–2012 elections

Grand Isle County 

 Grand Isle
 Isle La Motte
 North Hero
 South Hero

Chittenden County 

 Colchester

References

External links 

 Redistricting information from Vermont Legislature
 2002 and 2012 Redistricting information from Vermont Legislature
 Map of Vermont Senate districts and statistics (PDF) 2002–2012

Vermont Senate districts